Correntes (Portuguese word for "chains") is a town located in the state of Pernambuco, Brazil. It is located 257.7 km away from Recife, the capital of the state of Pernambuco. It has an estimated population of 18,268 inhabitants.

History
It was Antonio Machado Dias, a rich Portuguese farmer, who founded the town in 1826. Dias lived in the area where Correntes is currently located.  He commanded the building of a catholic church dedicated to his patron saint (Saint Anthony).
From that church, many people set up homes there, resulting in the village of Barra de Correntes, which ultimately became the town of Correntes.

Geography
 State - Pernambuco
 Region - Agreste Pernambucano
 Boundaries - Garanhuns and Palmeirina   (N);  Alagoas state  (S and E);   Lagoa do Ouro    (W).
 Area - 339.3 km2
 Elevation - 391 m
 Hydrography - Mundaú River
 Vegetation - Subcaducifólia forest
 Climate - Hot and humid
 Annual average temperature - 23.7 c
 Distance to Recife - 257.7 km

Economy
The main economic activities in Correntes are based in agribusiness, especially sweet potatoes, beans, manioc; and livestock such as cattle, sheep, horses and chickens.

Economic indicators

Economy by Sector
2006

Health indicators

Hymn
The hymn of Correntes was composed by Arlinda Brasil, a retired teacher.

Sample:

Portuguese version (original)
Correntes, nosso torrão adorado
Berço que nos viu nascer
Por ti daremos tudo e
Só a ti devemos querer

English version
Correntes, our dear land
Cradle that saw our birth
We will give everything for you
And only you we must love

References

Municipalities in Pernambuco